Simeon's Empire may refer to:

 
 First Bulgarian Empire